Artyomovo is a rural locality (a khutor) in Lizinovskoye Rural Settlement, Rossoshansky District, Voronezh Oblast, Russia. The population was 90 as of 2010.

Geography 
Artyomovo is located 11 km southwest of Rossosh (the district's administrative centre) by road. Chernyshovka is the nearest rural locality.

References 

Rural localities in Rossoshansky District